The Women's 400 metres competition at the 1968 Summer Olympics in Mexico City, Mexico was held at the University Olympic Stadium on October 14–16.

Summary
In the final, running in lane 1, Lillian Board went out fast, making up the stagger on Aurelia Pentón in lane 2.  In lane 4, Jarvis Scott did the same to Colette Besson in lane 5 who was passing Mirna van der Hoeven-Jansen in 6.  On the backstretch, Scott opened up a clear lead on the field.  Through the final turn, Natalya Pechonkina in lane 8 started to make headway against Scott's lead, with Board sandwiching the challenge from the inside.  Coming off the turn, Board attacked and took the lead, Besson was still more than two metres behind Scott, but the rush was on.  Besson shot past Scott and gained on Board with every step.  After her early exuberance, Scott had no answer.  Besson passed Board 10 metres before the line with Pechonkina taking bronze well ahead of Janet Simpson.

Competition format

The Women's 200m competition consisted of heats (Round 1), Semifinals and a Final. The four fastest competitors from each race in the heats qualified for the Semifinals. The four fastest competitors from each of the Semifinal races qualified for the final.

Records
Prior to the competition, the existing World and Olympic records were as follows.

Results

Round 1

Heat 1

Heat 2

Heat 3

Heat 4

Semifinals

Semifinal 1

Semifinal 2

Final

References

External links
 Official Olympic Report, la84foundation.org. Retrieved August 15, 2012.

Athletics at the 1968 Summer Olympics
400 metres at the Olympics
1968 in women's athletics
Women's events at the 1968 Summer Olympics